Africadalli Sheela ( Sheela in Africa) is a 1986 Indian Kannada-language fantasy-adventure film, written, directed and produced by Dwarakish. Made on the similar lines as the Hollywood film Sheena, the film was extensively shot in the forest ranges in the African continent. This film was the first Indian film to have been shot in the African forests.

The film featured Charan Raj and Sahila in the lead roles, along with Dwarakish, Srinivasa Murthy and Kalyan Kumar in supporting roles. The music was composed by Bappi Lahiri, with lyrics by Chi. Udaya Shankar and R. N. Jayagopal. Dwarakish remade the film in Tamil as Kizhakku Africavil Sheela, which starred Suresh, Nizhalgal Ravi and Sahila reprising her character, while she went on to reprise her character in its Hindi remake, titled Sheela, starring Nana Patekar.

Cast
Charan Raj as Shankar
Sahila Chadha as Sheela
Ranjita as Sheela Mother
Srinivasa Murthy as Ramu
Dwarakish
Kalyan Kumar as Rao Bahaddur
Disco Shanti
Thoogudeepa Srinivas as Raacha
Kanchana
Sudheer

Soundtrack
All the songs are composed and scored by Bappi Lahiri. This film marked the entry of singer K. S. Chithra to the Kannada cinema.

References

External links

1986 films
1980s Kannada-language films
Indian fantasy adventure films
1980s fantasy adventure films
Films set in Africa
Jungle girls
Films shot in Zimbabwe
Kannada films remade in other languages
Films scored by Bappi Lahiri